Fearless is a novel based on the U.S. television series Angel. Tagline: "Even heroes can know human weakness"

Plot summary
The characters of Angel Investigations are shocked to find themselves euphoric after a long night they cannot remember. Their clothes are bloody and torn, their bodies bruised, but their memories of the previous evening are hazy. They soon determine that they've been affected by demon pixie dust.

Angel, however, finds his superhuman healing failing him, and seems to be recovering at the rate of an average human. Unable to confide in his friends, Angel finds himself keeping secrets and collaborating with demons. If his friends go looking for another high in a battle of fearlessness, Angel is unsure if he can protect them.

Characters include: Angel, Cordelia, Wesley, Gunn, Fred, and Lorne

Continuity

The storyline is supposedly set in Angel season 3.

Canonical issues

Angel books such as this one are not usually considered by fans as canonical. Some fans consider them stories from the imaginations of authors and artists, while other fans consider them as taking place in an alternative fictional reality. However unlike fan fiction, overviews summarising their story, written early in the writing process, were 'approved' by both Fox and Joss Whedon (or his office), and the books were therefore later published as officially Buffy/Angel merchandise.

External links

Reviews
Teen-books.com - Reviews of this book

Angel (1999 TV series) novels
2003 fantasy novels